Volodymyr Danylovych Mozolyuk (born 28 January 1964 in Lutsk) is a Ukrainian retired professional footballer.

External links
 
 Mozolyu at ukr-football.org

References

1964 births
Living people
Footballers from Lutsk
Soviet footballers
Ukrainian footballers
Soviet Top League players
Ukrainian Premier League players
FC Volyn Lutsk players
FC Karpaty Lviv players
FC Dnipro players
FC Elektrometalurh-NZF Nikopol players
Motor Lublin players
Maccabi Kafr Kanna F.C. players
Expatriate footballers in Poland
Expatriate footballers in Israel
Ukrainian expatriate footballers
Ukrainian expatriate sportspeople in Poland
Ukrainian expatriate sportspeople in Israel
Ukrainian football managers
Association football forwards
Sportspeople from Volyn Oblast